Choisy-le-Roi is a commune in the Val-de-Marne department, in the southeastern suburbs of Paris, Île-de-France.

Geography
The neighbouring communes are, from the north and clockwise: Vitry-sur-Seine, Alfortville, Créteil, Valenton, Villeneuve-Saint-Georges, Orly and Thiais.

Climate

Choisy-le-Roi has a oceanic climate (Köppen climate classification Cfb).

Population

Transport
Choisy-le-Roi is served by Choisy-le-Roi station on Paris RER line C. It is also served by Créteil-Pompadour station on Paris RER line D.

Education
Public schools include:
 Preschools (maternelles): Marcel Cachin, Danièle Casanova, Eugénie Cotton, du Centre – Auguste Blanqui, du Parc – Armand Noblet, Victor Hugo, Paul Langevin, Henri Wallon
 Elementary schools: Marcel Cachin, Jean Macé, du Centre – Auguste Blanqui, du Parc- Armand Noblet, Victor Hugo, Joliot Curie, Paul Langevin, Nelson Mandela
 Junior high schools (collèges): Émile Zola, Jules Vallès, Henri Matisse, College Paul Klee.
Senior high schools: Lycée Professionnel Jean Macé Choisy-le-Roi, Lycée des métiers Jacques Brel

There is a private school serving elementary to senior high school, groupe scolaire Saint André Choisy-le-Roi.

Personalities 
 Louise Bourgeois, artist
 Philippe Di Folco, writer
 Yves Pires, artist
 Zainoul Bah, basketball player
 Davy Dona, karateka
 Jeremy Nzeulie, basketball player
 Madimoussa Traore, footballer
 Suzanne Chaisemartin (1921–2017) organist was born in Choisy-le-Roy
 Hugo Valente, racing driver

International relations
Choisy-le-Roi is twinned with:
 Đống Đa (Hanoi), Vietnam
 Hennigsdorf, Germany
 Lugo, Italy
 Târnova, Romania

See also
Communes of the Val-de-Marne department

References

External links

 City Council of Choisy-le-Roi website 
 City Council of Choisy-le-Roi website  (Archive)

Communes of Val-de-Marne